2016 Men's European Water Polo Championship Qualifiers are series of qualification tournaments to decide the participants of the 2016 Men's European Water Polo Championship.

Teams directly qualified to the 2016 EWPC
 (Hosts, Winners of 2014 Men's European Water Polo Championship)
 (Runners-up, 2014 Men's European Water Polo Championship)
 (3rd Place, 2014 Men's European Water Polo Championship)
 (4th Place, 2014 Men's European Water Polo Championship)
 (5th Place, 2014 Men's European Water Polo Championship)
 (6th Place, 2014 Men's European Water Polo Championship)
 (7th Place, 2014 Men's European Water Polo Championship)
 (8th Place, 2014 Men's European Water Polo Championship)

Qualifying round 1

Group A

Group B

Group C

Group D

Qualifying round 2

Group E

Group F

Group G

Group H

References

Men
Men's European Water Polo Championship